The Fort Qu'Appelle station is a former railway station in Fort Qu'Appelle, Saskatchewan. It was built by the Grand Trunk Pacific Railway in 1911 and was taken over by the Canadian National Railway in 1919; it continued to operate passenger service until 1962.  The -story wood-frame, stucco-clad building is a designated municipal heritage building.  It is now used as a tourist information centre.

References 

Canadian National Railway stations in Saskatchewan
Grand Trunk Pacific Railway stations in Saskatchewan
Railway stations in Canada opened in 1911
Railway stations closed in 1962
Disused railway stations in Canada
Fort Qu'Appelle